Nagasaki is an oratorio composed by Soviet composer Alfred Schnittke in 1958, at the age of 25. It was Schnittke's graduation composition in the Moscow Conservatory, and the topic was suggested by his teacher Evgeny Golubev. 

The work was considered formalistic, and Schnittke was accused of forgetting the principles of Realism. Thus, he suppressed the expressionistic central movement depicting the nuclear explosion and modified the finale. It was recorded by the Moscow Radio Symphony in 1959 and broadcast to Japan through Voice of Russia, but it wasn't printed and it didn't receive any subsequent performances. Nagasaki was finally given its public premiere in its original form in Cape Town on 23 November 2006, eight years after Schnittke's death, by Rupert Hanneli and the Cape Philharmonic conducted by Owain Arwel Hughes.

Form 
It consists of five movements, on Soviet and Japanese lyrics: 

 "Nagasaki, City of Grief" (Anatoly Sofronov)
 "The Morning" (Tōson Shimazaki)
 "On that Fateful Day" (A. Sofronov)
 "On the Ashes" (Yoneda Eisaku)
 "The Sun of Peace" (Georgy Fere)

Recordings
 Rupert Hanneli, mezzo-soprano. Cape Philharmonic – Owain Arwel Hughes. BIS, 2007.

Notes

References

See also 

 Alfred Schnittke
 Atomic bombings of Hiroshima and Nagasaki

Compositions by Alfred Schnittke
1958 compositions
Oratorios